Francis Haas may refer to:

 Francis Townley Haas (born 1996), American swimmer
 Francis J. Haas (1889–1953), American Roman Catholic bishop